Steve Harris may refer to:

 Steve Harris (musician) (born 1956), founder member and bassist of the band Iron Maiden
 Steve Harris (actor) (born 1965), American film and TV actor
 Steve Harris (basketball) (1963–2016), American basketball player
 Steve Harris (writer) (born 1954), English horror writer
 Steve Harris (drummer) (1948–2008), rock and jazz musician; member of Pinski Zoo and founder of Zaum
 Steve Harris (bowls), Welsh lawn and indoor bowler
 Steve Harris, founder of the American magazine Electronic Gaming Monthly
 Steve Harris, guitarist for the band Archive
 Steve Harris, guitarist for the British band Ark
 Steve Harris, guitarist for the band Shy
 Steve Harris, president of the Fremantle Football Club since 2009

See also
 Stephen Harris (disambiguation)
 Steven Harris (disambiguation)